Glenna Shirleen Roeder is a geneticist known for identifying and characterizing the yeast genes that regulate the process of meiosis with particular emphasis on synapsis.

Education and career 
Roeder has a B.Sc. from Dalhousie University (1973) and earned her Ph.D. in 1978 from the University of Toronto. Following her Ph.D. she was a postdoctoral fellow at Cornell University before moving to the faculty at Yale University in 1981. In 2001 she was named the Eugene Higgins Professor of Genetics in the Molecular, Cellular, and Developmental Biology Department at Yale University. Roeder retired in 2012 and, as of 2021, she is Professor Emeritus at Yale University.

Research 
Roeder used budding yeast as a model system to examine meiosis. She discovered the Zip1 protein, and discovered two distinct processes that regulate the recombination between chromosomes in meiosis and also a process inhibiting recombination.

Selected publications

Awards and honors
In 1984, Roeder received a Young Investigator award from the National Science Foundation. She was named an HHMI investigator in 1997, and was elected to the National Academy of Sciences in 2009. In 2010, she was chosen as a Fellow of the American Association for the Advancement of Science and elected to the American Academy of Microbiology.

References

Meiosis
American women geneticists
Yale University faculty
Living people
Year of birth missing (living people)
American geneticists
Fellows of the American Association for the Advancement of Science